Bernt Anker (22 November 1746 – 21 April 1805) was a Norwegian merchant, chamberlain and playwright.

He was born in Christiania, the son of Christian Ancher and a brother of Peder Anker and cousin of Carsten Anker. His business included trade in timber on a large scale, with a large income from supplying the fleet of England. He eventually became the wealthiest person in Norway. Among his properties were Frogner Manor and Moss Jernverk. His magnificent home Paléet near Bjørvika was used as a Royal residence after his death, until the completion of the Royal Palace in Christiania.

He was elected a Fellow of the Royal Society of London in 1782. He was decorated Knight of the Order of the Dannebrog in 1803.

A street in Oslo, is named after him. The street was named after Anker in 1852, but it was not completed until 1902.

References

1746 births
1805 deaths
Writers from Oslo
Danish merchants
Norwegian merchants
Norwegian dramatists and playwrights
Anker family
Noble Knights of the Order of the Dannebrog
Fellows of the Royal Society
18th-century Danish businesspeople
18th-century Norwegian businesspeople